St. Joseph by-the-Sea High School (also known as SJS or Sea) is a co-educational Catholic school in the Huguenot neighborhood of Staten Island, New York, United States. Though technically an independent school with its own board of trustees, it functions for all intents and purposes as a school of the Roman Catholic Archdiocese of New York. The school serves approximately 1,200 students in 9th, 10th, 11th and 12th grades.

Notable alumni
 Melissa Anelli (1997), New York Times best-selling author 
 Joseph Borelli, politician, New York State Assemblymen
 Sheena Colette, actress
 Pete Davidson, comedian, actor
 Matt Festa, baseball player
 Ollie Ogbu (2005), NFL/CFL professional football player, Hudson Valley Fort
 Chris Terrio, screenwriter
 Joey Salads, YouTube personality

Notes and references

External links

St. Joseph by the Sea High School official website

Educational institutions established in 1963
1963 establishments in New York City
Roman Catholic high schools in Staten Island